Sean Thomas Erlington (born July 28, 1992) is a professional Canadian football running back for the Hamilton Tiger-Cats of the Canadian Football League (CFL).

University career
Thomas Erlington played U Sports football with the Montreal Carabins from 2013 to 2016 where he was a member of the 50th Vanier Cup championship team in 2014.

Professional career
Thomas Erlington was drafted in the eighth round, 66th overall by the Hamilton Tiger-Cats in the 2017 CFL Draft and signed with the team on May 24, 2017. He played in his first career game on July 29, 2017, against the Calgary Stampeders, but did not record any stats. In the first season of his professional career, he was largely a special teams contributor, but blossomed into an effective change of pace back and returner in 2018, putting up 218 yards on 34 carries for better than a 6-yard per carry average. He scored two touchdowns during the regular season; a rushing score and a blocked punt recovery for a touchdown. Both scores came against Montreal, although in separate games. During the playoffs, Thomas Erlington had three rushes for 15 yards as well as a receiving touchdown for the Ti-Cats, who reached the East Division finals but were defeated by Ottawa, who advanced to the 106th Grey Cup. Following the season, he was signed to a two-year extension.

Thomas Erlington suffered a knee injury early in the 2019 season and underwent surgery on July 10, 2019. He signed a contract extension with the team on December 27, 2020. However, he did not play in 2020 due to the cancellation of the 2020 CFL season.

In a shortened 2021 season, Thomas Erlington played in 12 regular season games and started in eight, carrying the ball 70 times for 356 yards and four touchdowns and recording 20 receptions for 129 yards and one touchdown. He also dressed in all three post-season games, including his first Grey Cup game, but did not record any stats in the championship as the Tiger-Cats lost to the Winnipeg Blue Bombers 33–25 in overtime in the 108th Grey Cup game. On the day before the start of free agency, Thomas Erlington re-signed with the Tiger-Cats on February 7, 2022.

In his first start of the 2022 season, on June 18, 2022, Thomas Erlington had five carries for 18 rushing yards and seven receptions for 72 yards and a touchdown, but had a costly drop in overtime that resulted in an interception and victory for the Calgary Stampeders. He finished the 2022 season having played in all 18 regular season games carrying the ball 53 times for 371 yards with one rushing touchdown. He also caught 25 passes for 216 yards with another score. Erlington and the Ti-Cats agreed to a contract extension on February 6, 2023.

References

External links
 Hamilton Tiger-Cats bio

1992 births
Living people
Anglophone Quebec people
Canadian football running backs
Hamilton Tiger-Cats players
Montreal Carabins football players
Players of Canadian football from Quebec
Canadian football people from Montreal